Torrecampo is a city located in the province of Córdoba, Spain. According to the 2006 census (INE), the city has a population of 1320 inhabitants.

References

External links
Torrecampo - Sistema de Información Multiterritorial de Andalucía

Municipalities in the Province of Córdoba (Spain)